Hat Island is a census-designated place (CDP) in Snohomish County, Washington, United States. The population was 41 at the 2010 census. The CDP occupies an island in Possession Sound called Hat Island, also known as Gedney Island. The island lies in Possession Sound between the mainland city of Everett, Washington, and the southern part of Whidbey Island. Gedney Island has a land area of 1.768 km2 (436.8 acres) and a population of 13 people was reported as of the 2000 census.

Gedney Island was first mentioned in the historical record by naturalist Archibald Menzies of the Vancouver Expedition in 1792. It was named by Charles Wilkes in 1841; although other sources say it was for John B. Gedney or Jonathon Haight Gedney, Wilkes's memoirs say he named it for Lt Thomas R. Gedney. The name Hat is for the shape of a beach and treeless ledge, first used in 1870. Since 1980 the island would be called Gedney Island (Hat).

There is currently one walk-on ferry named the Hat Express which transports walk-on passengers to and from the island. The maximum capacity of the ferry is 88 passengers. It runs a limited schedule on Thursdays, Friday evenings, and weekends between the Everett Yacht Club on the west end of 13th Street in Everett, and the Hat Island Marina.

Geography 
According to the United States Census Bureau, the CDP has a total area of 0.692 square miles (1.79 km), of which, 0.688 square miles (1.78 km) of it is land and 0.004 square miles (0.01 km) of it (0.58%) is water.

Hat Island is also the name of an uninhabited island in Padilla Bay, Skagit County.

Parks and recreation

Hat Island has a marina with 127 slips and a golf course, both maintained by the Hat Island Community Association.

References

External links
 Hat Island community site the site contains a very complete history of the island

Census-designated places in Washington (state)
Census-designated places in Snohomish County, Washington